Felice Borgoglio (born 11 August 1941) is an Italian politician who served as Mayor of Alessandria from 1972 to 1979 and as Deputy for four legislatures (1979–1983, 1983–1987, 1987–1992, 1992–1994).

References

1941 births
Living people
Mayors of Alessandria
Deputies of Legislature VIII of Italy
Deputies of Legislature IX of Italy
Deputies of Legislature X of Italy
Deputies of Legislature XI of Italy
20th-century Italian politicians
Italian Socialist Party politicians
People from Alessandria